World Soul may refer to:

 Anima mundi, the "world-soul" in Plato and derived traditions in Western philosophy
  Weltseele "world-soul" in German philosophy, see Weltgeist ("world-spirit")
 Atman (disambiguation), a Sanskrit term sometimes equated with anima mundi
 Dusha Mira (1964), Russian science fiction novel, see World Soul (novel)